Jasper in a Jam is a 1946 short film in the Puppetoons series produced and originated by George Pal. It starred the voice of singer Peggy Lee, and was directed by Duke Goldstone and released by Paramount Pictures. It is included in The Puppetoon Movie.

Plot summary
The story takes place in a pawnshop where a young African-American boy named Jasper visits in the city. Every night at midnight, all the musical instruments in the pawnshop come to life and play. The music of Charlie Barnet and his Orchestra are featured playing the songs "Pompton Turnpike" and "Redskin Rhumba" and Lee (as a singing harp) sings "Old Man Mose is Dead". Meanwhile, Jasper after playing a clarinet and jamming with a magic trumpet he is then trapped by a totem pole which plays the saxophone. while being stalked by a clay Indian who throws axes at him. When the night watchman enters the shop, all the items return to their places and Jasper finally makes his escape.

References

External links
 
 

1946 films
1940s animated short films
Stop-motion animated short films
1946 musical films
1940s American animated films
American animated short films
1946 animated films
American musical films
Paramount Pictures short films
African-American films
African-American musical films
Films about Native Americans
Puppetoons
Short films directed by George Pal
1940s English-language films